Cradle Snatchers is a 1927 American silent comedy film directed by Howard Hawks. The picture is based on the 1925 Russell Medcraft and Norma Mitchell stage play of the same name that starred Mary Boland, Edna May Oliver, Raymond Hackett, Gene Raymond and Humphrey Bogart. An incomplete copy, missing part of reel 3 and all of reel 4, exists in the Library of Congress.

The film was later remade as Why Leave Home? (1929).

Plot
Three unhappy, middle-aged housewives teach their adulterous husbands a lesson by starting affairs with college-aged young men during the jazz age.

Cast
Louise Fazenda as Susan Martin
Ethel Wales as Ethel Drake
Dorothy Phillips as Kitty Ladd
J. Farrell MacDonald as George Martin
Franklin Pangborn as Howard Drake
William B. Davidson as Roy Ladd
Joseph Striker as Joe Valley
Nick Stuart as Henry Winton
Arthur Lake as Oscar
Diane Ellis as Ann Hall (billed Dione Ellis)
Sammy Cohen as Ike Ginsberg
Tyler Brooke as Osteopath

References

External links

Press or lobby advert

1927 films
American silent feature films
Films directed by Howard Hawks
Silent American comedy films
American films based on plays
Fox Film films
1927 comedy films
American black-and-white films
1920s rediscovered films
Rediscovered American films
1920s American films